Alan Walker Tyson,  (27 October 1926 – 10 November 2000) was a Glasgow-born British musicologist who specialized in studies of the music of Wolfgang Amadeus Mozart and Ludwig van Beethoven. He wrote the (deliberately concise) Thematic catalogue of the works of Muzio Clementi which appeared in 1967 at Hans Schneider of Tutzing/Germany, with no following editions up to date. Tyson was Senior Research Fellow at All Souls College, Oxford, and a Fellow of the British Academy.

One of his most celebrated publications was Mozart: Studies of the Autograph Scores, whose chapters detailed the study of watermarks in Mozart's autographs as a method of dating the scores. This book also included several of Tyson's discoveries, such as the true ending to the Rondo in A for Piano and Orchestra, K. 386, which previously had only been known in a completion arranged for solo piano by Cipriani Potter and published in 1837. Tyson also established that the standard version of the second movement of Mozart's Horn Concerto in D, K. 412/514, was actually completed after Mozart's death by his pupil Franz Xaver Süssmayr.

Additionally, Tyson edited a noteworthy series of volumes entitled Beethoven Studies. His interest in watermarks and paper studies on Beethoven scores actually predated his involvement in those of Mozart.

Prior to becoming intensely involved in musicology, Tyson was lecturer in Psychopathology and Developmental Psychology at Oxford from 1968 to 1970. He was co-editor of The Standard Edition of the Complete Psychological Works of Sigmund Freud for which he also translated some texts, notably Leonardo da Vinci, A Memory of His Childhood and The Psychopathology of Everyday Life. He had read Classical Moderations and Greats at the University of Oxford, and medicine at University College Hospital.

Sources
Alan Tyson (Obituary), The Guardian, 14 November 2000.
Alan Tyson, Mozart: Studies of the Autograph Scores, Cambridge, MA: Harvard University Press, 1987. .
Ch. 17, "The Rondo for Piano and Orchestra, K. 386" (pp. 262–289), presents Tyson's discovery of Mozart's original ending.
Ch. 16, "Mozart's D Major Horn Concerto: Questions of Date and of Authenticity" (pp. 246–261) deals with Tyson's findings regarding K. 412/514.

1926 births
2000 deaths
People educated at Rugby School
Alumni of Magdalen College, Oxford
Fellows of All Souls College, Oxford
Fellows of the British Academy
Beethoven scholars
Mozart scholars
Translators of Sigmund Freud
20th-century translators
20th-century British writers
Commanders of the Order of the British Empire
20th-century British musicologists